Kilayikode  is a village in Kasaragod district in the state of Kerala, India.

Transportation
Local roads have access to NH.66 which connects to Mangalore in the north and Calicut in the south. The nearest railway station is Cheruvathur on Mangalore-Palakkad line. There are airports at Mangalore and Calicut.

References

Cheruvathur area